Ben Murdoch-Masila (born 7 February 1991) is a Tonga international rugby league footballer who plays as a  and  for the St George Illawarra Dragons in the NRL.

He played for the Wests Tigers and the Penrith Panthers in the National Rugby League, and the Salford Red Devils and the Warrington Wolves in the Super League.

Background
Murdoch-Masila was born in Otahuhu, New Zealand and is of Tongan descent.

Playing career
Murdoch-Masila played junior football with Otahuhu Black. He undertook a scholarship with Wests Tigers at Keebra Park High School and was a member of the team that won the 2009 Arrive Alive Cup. Murdoch-Masila weighed 150 kg when he arrived at Keebra Park, dropping 40 kg before he joined the Wests Tigers NYC team.

Murdoch-Masila made his NRL debut in the first round of the 2010 NRL semi finals against the Sydney Roosters. He is one of very few players to have made his first appearance in a finals match.

In 2011, Murdoch-Masila made a further seven appearances, and may have made more if not for injuries. At the end of the season he was selected for the Junior Kiwis.

A regular on the bench in 2012, Murdoch-Masila played in 20 games for the season and scored five tries, including a double against Parramatta. He also signed an extension to stay with the club until the end of 2015, with coach Tim Sheens saying, "There is no doubt Ben has enormous talent and potential. He is a strike weapon and can become a top line player of the game with the right kind of commitment to his training regime."

Missing only one game, Murdoch-Masila was one of the most regular first grade players for Wests Tigers in 2013. He started the season playing from the reserve bench, but started in the back row in the last five games of the season. In April, Murdoch-Masila made his international debut, playing in the Pacific Rugby League International for the Tongan side that thrashed Samoa 36–4. He was chosen to represent Tonga in the 2013 World Cup, but a leg injury in his first hit-up of the tournament saw him take no further part.

On 30 April 2014, Murdoch-Masila signed a -year contract effective immediately with the Penrith Panthers, after being released from the final year and a half of his Wests Tigers contract.
Murdoch-Masila was a cult hero at Warrington Wolves, and has his own terrace song;
”1,2,3,4 Party on, Ben Murdoch-Masila,
Party on - he’s a Tongan hero,
Party on, he never gives the ball away-ay”.
He played in the 2018 Challenge Cup Final defeat by the Catalans Dragons at Wembley Stadium.
He played in the 2018 Super League Grand Final defeat by Wigan at Old Trafford.
He played in the 2019 Challenge Cup Final victory over St Helens at Wembley Stadium.
In round 1 of the 2021 NRL season, he made his club debut for the New Zealand Warriors in their 19-6 victory over the Gold Coast.  He made a total of 11 appearances for the New Zealand club as they finished 15th on the table.

International career
On 2 May 2015, Murdoch-Masila played for Tonga in their Polynesian Cup clash with Pacific rivals Samoa. During the 2015 season, he did not play any NRL games for the Panthers and was not re-signed beyond 2015. On 17 October 2015, Murdoch-Masila played for Tonga in their Asia-Pacific Qualifier match against the Cook Islands for the 2017 Rugby League World Cup.

He played in every match of Tonga's historic charge to the semi-finals of the 2017 Rugby League World Cup, and set up a vital try in their shock win over New Zealand in the pool stage of the tournament.

References

External links

Warrington Wolves profile
Penrith Panthers profile
SL profile
2017 RLWC profile

1991 births
Living people
Balmain Ryde-Eastwood Tigers players
New Zealand rugby league players
New Zealand sportspeople of Tongan descent
Penrith Panthers players
New Zealand Warriors players
Junior Kiwis players
Otahuhu Leopards players
Rugby league players from Auckland
Rugby league props
Rugby league second-rows
Rugby league locks
People educated at Keebra Park State High School
Tonga national rugby league team players
Warrington Wolves players
Wests Tigers players
Wests Tigers NSW Cup players